Poplar Creek is a creek tributary of the narrowed river-like side of East Bay, in the Holley neighborhood of Navarre, Florida.

References 

Rivers of Florida
Bodies of water of Santa Rosa County, Florida
Navarre, Florida